Baddiley is a civil parish in Cheshire East, England. It contains nine buildings that are recorded in the National Heritage List for England as designated listed buildings.  Of these, one is listed at Grade I, the highest grade, and the others are at Grade II.  Apart from the village of Baddily, the parish is entirely rural.  The listed buildings consist of the village church, houses and farm buildings.  The Llangollen Canal runs through the parish, and the three locks on the canal in the parish are also listed.

Key

Buildings

References
Citations

Sources

 

 

Listed buildings in the Borough of Cheshire East
Lists of listed buildings in Cheshire